Liepāja Theatre is a theatre in Liepāja, Latvia. It was established in 1907.

References

External links
Official website

Theatres in Latvia
Liepāja
1907 establishments in the Russian Empire